Addy Engels (born 16 June 1977 in Emmen, Drenthe) is a former Dutch professional road bicycle racer, who competed between 2000 and 2011. After retiring, Engels joined the  team as a sports director.

Major results
Sources:

1998
 1st  U23 Road Race championships
1999
 2nd U23 Road Race championships
 5th Overall Le Triptyque des Monts et Châteaux
2000
 2nd DAB Classic Dortmund
2004
 8th Overall Rheinland-Pfalz Rundfahrt
2007
 9th Overall Ster Elektrotoer

Grand Tour general classification results timeline

References

External links

1977 births
Living people
Dutch male cyclists
Sportspeople from Emmen, Netherlands
UCI Road World Championships cyclists for the Netherlands
Cyclists from Drenthe
21st-century Dutch people